Biketown (stylized as BIKETOWN), also known as Biketown PDX, is a bicycle-sharing system in Portland, Oregon, that began operation on July 19, 2016. The system is owned by Portland Bureau of Transportation (PBOT) and operated by Lyft, with Nike, Inc. as the title sponsor. At launch, the system had 100 stations and 1,000 bicycles serving the city's central and eastside neighborhoods, with hopes to expand outward.

History

Planning for a modern bicycle-sharing system for Portland began in 2009, under the direction of PBOT. Beginning in 1994, a group of Portlanders experimented with a free community bike sharing system called the "Yellow Bike Project"; the program, inspired by a similar scheme in Amsterdam and operated by the Community Cycling Center, was declared a failure three years later after many of the bikes were subject to vandalism, theft and disrepair.

In December 2011, Metro approved the allocation of a $2 million federal grant to PBOT for the development of a bike share system. Alta Bike Share, a national operator of similar systems headquartered in Portland, was contracted in September 2012 to be the system's operator. The $4 million cost of the system and inability to secure a corporate sponsor led to several delays in the planned launch.

In March 2014, selected supplier Bixi declared bankruptcy, forcing another delay in the system's launch to 2015. Planned operator Alta Bike Share would later be sold to Motivate in October.

In September 2015, the Portland City Council approved a new contract with Motivate to move forward on the bikeshare program. Motivate went on to place a $1.5 million order placed with Social Bicycles to manufacture and deliver "smart" bicycles that include on-board computers and other technologies.

In January 2016, Portland-area based Nike signed a $10 million, five-year deal to be the program's sponsor, naming it "Biketown". On June 13, 2016, officials announced various details for the program, including a launch date of July 19. More than 1,000 Portlanders signed up for the first batch of annual memberships by launch day, and almost 2,500 during the first month of the service.

The service launched on July 19, 2016, during a ceremony in which 150 riders took an inaugural ride across the Tilikum Crossing bridge. During the service's first month, almost 59,000 rides were taken. Holders of annual memberships  accounted for 36 percent of rides taken during that period.

The placement of Biketown stations that replaced public street parking sparked some controversy over a "lack of outreach" by PBOT.

Service area
Portland residents were surveyed online and invited to five open house discussions to decide the locations of the bike racks. The final locations were based on the 4,500 responses.

Neighborhoods that are served by Biketown include:

 Downtown Portland
 Pearl District
 Goose Hollow
 Nob Hill
 Rose Quarter
 Lloyd District
 Piedmont
 Humboldt
 Kerns
 Buckman
 Hosford-Abernethy

Pricing and fees

Biketown operates with three payment options for riders. A single-ride fare of $2.50 includes 30 minutes of riding. A day pass ($12) includes 180 minutes of riding and the ability to rent up to 4 bicycles at a time (at a cost of $6 each). An annual membership of $12 per month includes unlimited rides within a 90-minute daily limit, as well as the 4-bicycle maximum available to day-pass users.

Riders making extended trips over their allotted time limit are charged 10 cents per additional minute. A fee of $2 is charged for locking a bicycle at a public rack within the system area; a fee of $20 is charged for the doing the same outside of the system area. A $1 account credit is awarded for bringing a bicycle from a public rack to a designated station.

There is a discount program available for low income participants for $3/month. 

A fee of $1,500 is charged for a lost bicycle.

The city's contract with operator Motivate includes provisions to introduce a discount to 500 low-income residents of $35 per year.

Equipment

Biketown's fleet of 1,000 bicycles were manufactured by Social Bicycles of Brooklyn, New York and designed in part by Nike, at a cost of $1,500 each. The eight-speed bikes weigh  and come equipped with automatic lights and a bell; the seat is positioned for upright ridership. Unlike a typical bike share system, Biketown's bicycles do not need to be docked at a designated station, instead using on-board computers with location tracking and U locks; this allows bikes to be stored at public bicycle racks, though users are charged an additional fee. Bikes are rented by customers using a PIN, generated by a smartphone app or computer, or a member card. Biketown is the largest self-secured bike share system in North America.

In June 2016, PBOT announced plans to add "adaptive bikes", such as handcycles and tricycles, that can be rented for people with disabilities. They will be branded as Biketown but will be organized through local adaptive bike shops, rather than at the standard street kiosks.

Biketown does not provide helmets for its users, but does offer coupons to purchase one at a store.

The original fleet of Biketown bicycles were retired in September 2020 after their replacement e-bicycles entered service. The remaining 750 bicycles were donated to a bikeshare operator in Hamilton, Ontario, Canada.

Related programs

Biketown WHQ

Not part of the Biketown PDX service, but sharing some aspects, is a private bike-sharing program for employees of Nike in the Beaverton area, where Nike's world headquarters is located.  As of 2016, the program had already been in place "for years", but was recently renamed Biketown WHQ.  The suffix, standing for World Headquarters, is intended to differentiate the program from the public Biketown PDX service in Portland.  The City of Portland owns the rights to the "Biketown" name, but gave Nike permission to use it for its program.  It has a fleet of 400 bicycles, which company employees can use to go between any of Nike's several Beaverton-area facilities.  In 2016, when Nike signed a 10-year sponsorship contract with Portland for the latter's new bike-sharing service, it also purchased for its own service new bicycles of the same design (and color: orange) as used on the Biketown PDX service, from Social Bicycles.  However, the Biketown WHQ program is operated by Holy Spokes, a Portland bike shop, rather than by Motivate.

See also

 Cycling in Portland, Oregon
 List of bicycle-sharing systems

References

External links

 

2016 establishments in Oregon
Bicycle sharing in the United States
Community bicycle programs
Cycling in Portland, Oregon
Organizations based in Portland, Oregon